Lemuel Lewis Means (December 14, 1898 – November 17, 1963) was an American Negro league catcher in the 1920s.

A native of Washington, Georgia, Means attended Morris Brown College. He made his Negro leagues debut in 1920 with the Bacharach Giants, and finished his career in 1928 with the Birmingham Black Barons. Means died in Chicago, Illinois in 1963 at age 64.

References

External links
 and Baseball-Reference Black Baseball stats and Seamheads

1898 births
1963 deaths
Bacharach Giants players
Birmingham Black Barons players
20th-century African-American sportspeople
Baseball catchers